In the Meantime is the third studio album by Canadian singer and songwriter Alessia Cara, released on September 24, 2021, by Def Jam Recordings. Cara collaborated with Jon Levine, Salaam Remi and Joel Little among several other producers on the project. Deemed as a concept album based "In the meantime between life and death", the album unravels the anxieties of introspection, healing, love and self-reflection.

Three songs were released to promote the album: "Sweet Dream", "Shapeshifter", and "Best Days", with "Sweet Dream" charting at number 51 on the Billboard Canadian Hot 100 chart while the latter two acted as promotional singles. In the Meantime follows Cara's EP This Summer (2019).

Singles 
"Sweet Dream" was released as one of two songs for the album on July 15, 2021, along with "Shapeshifter". The former of the two reached number 53 in Canada.

"Best Days" was released as the second promotional single, alongside the album, on September 24, 2021. Its music video was released on the same day.

Critical reception 

In the Meantime received generally positive reviews from music critics upon its release. On the review aggregator site Metacritic, the album holds an average score of 80 out of 100, based on five reviews, indicating "generally favorable reviews". It is Cara's highest rated album on the site.

Writing for AllMusic, Andy Kellman noted that the album's tracks all have a "common" sound while opining that "from start to finish, lolling hooks flood Cara's mind as much as indecision, skepticism, and other negative thoughts ... enabling the listener to have a proper sulk that soothes." Nick Levine of NME wrote that the album proves "there's still plenty of creative gas in the tank" and opined that "I Miss You Don’t Call Me" could be "the best song she has ever written," ending his review by stating "her best days definitely lie ahead." Dani Blum of Pitchfork appreciated Cara's voice and the album's themes, but felt that "she dilutes them when she relies too much on metaphor and conceit." Writing for PopMatters, Jeffrey Davies called the album "sonically and lyrically her best work yet," noting that no song "ever feels like filler" while pointing out "Best Days" as one of the standout tracks. Sarah Grant of Rolling Stone named the album a "mighty pop opera" that "walks us through the five stages of grief."

Track listing 

Note
  indicates a co-producer
  indicates a vocal producer

Personnel
Musicians

 Alessia Cara – vocals (all tracks), drums (1, 2)
 Jon Levine – bass, keyboards, programming (1, 2, 7, 12, 13); guitar (1, 2, 7, 13), piano (1, 2), drums, percussion (7, 12, 13)
 Cameron Bright – background vocals, guitar, programming (3)
 Andrew McAnsh – trumpet (3)
 Johann Deterville – bass, keyboards, percussion, piano (4)
 Salaam Remi – bass, drums, guitar, percussion (5)
 Vincent Henry – guitar (5)
 Brandee Younger – harp (5)
 Mike Wise – programming (6, 8, 10, 14, 17); guitar, keyboards percussion (17)
 Dylan Wiggins – bass, guitar, keyboards, programming (9)
 Doc McKinney – keyboards, percussion, programming (9)
 Greg Kurstin – bass, drums, guitar, keyboards (11)
 Bianca McClure – strings (12)
 Spencer Stewart – bass, drums, guitar, keyboards, percussion, programming (13)
 Jason Evigan – guitar, keyboards (13)
 Herag Sanbalian – guitar (14, 17), bass (17)
 Jake Torrey – guitar (16)
 Halatrax – keyboards, percussion, programming (16)
 Andrew McEnaney – drums (17)
 Aaron Paris – strings (17)
 Joel Little – drum programming, guitar, keyboards (18)

Technical

 Chris Gehringer – mastering
 Manny Marroquin – mixing (1–4, 6–12, 14–18)
 Salaam Remi – mixing (5)
 Spencer Stewart – mixing (13), recording (7, 12, 13) 
 Jon Levine – recording (1, 2, 7, 12)
 Alessia Cara – recording (3, 11, 16, 18)
 Cameron Bright – recording (3)
 Banx & Ranx – recording (4) 
 Boi-1da – recording (4)
 Don Mills – recording (4)
 YogiTheProducer – recording (4)
 Ryan Evans – recording (5)
 Mike Wise – recording (6, 8, 10, 14, 17)
 Dylan Wiggins – recording (9)
 Doc McKinney – recording (9)
 Dan Cinelli – recording (9)
 Greg Kurstin – recording (11)
 Julian Burg – recording (11)
 Billboard – recording (15)
 Halatrax – recording (16)
 Jake Torrey – recording (16)
 Joel Little – recording (18)

Artwork
 Alessia Cara – creative direction
 James Ronkko – design
 Mary Chen – photography
 Andy Proctor – package production

Charts

References

2021 albums
Alessia Cara albums
Def Jam Recordings albums
EMI Records albums